Koniska is an unincorporated community in McLeod County, in the U.S. state of Minnesota.

History
Koniska was platted in 1856. A post office was established at Koniska in 1860, and remained in operation until it was discontinued in 1882.

References

Unincorporated communities in McLeod County, Minnesota
Unincorporated communities in Minnesota